Greatest Comedy Hits is the first compilation album by the American comedian Eddie Murphy. It was released on May 27, 1997, by Columbia Records, produced by Vernon '"Vas" Lynch Jr  and Murphy. Greatest Comedy Hits included his greatest stand-up comedy sketches as well as recordings from his films, Coming to America, The Nutty Professor and Eddie Murphy Raw.

Track listing
"The Barbecue" - 1:45 (originally released in 1983) 
"Drinking Fathers" - 8:09 (originally released in 1982) 
"Singers" - 6:50 (originally released in 1983) 
"Old Jew" - 1:54
"Ice Cream Man" - 3:25 (originally released in 1983) 
"Boxers" - 3:11
"Hit by a Car" - 5:49 (originally released in 1982) 
"Cumin' Hard" - 5:52
"Skeleton in Closet" - 6:13
"Grandma Klump" - 2:19
"Buckwheat" - 2:06 (originally released in 1982) 
"Niggaz in the '70s" - 1:36
"Moses" - 3:49
"Lost in Space" - 0:47
"Little Richard" - 1:06
"Black Sambo" - 1:38
"Almost Fucked a Midget" - 4:53
"Seeing Birth" - 3:10

References

1997 greatest hits albums
Columbia Records compilation albums
1990s comedy albums
Comedy compilation albums
Eddie Murphy compilation albums